Borella South Grama Niladhari Division is a Grama Niladhari Division of the Thimbirigasyaya Divisional Secretariat of Colombo District of Western Province, Sri Lanka.

Borella, Welikada, Lady Ridgeway Hospital for Children, Devi Balika Vidyalaya, Paikiasothy Saravanamuttu Stadium, 2012 Welikada prison riot, Department of Prisons, Western Hospital, Welikada Prison and Kanatte Cemetery are located within, nearby or associated with Borella South.

Borella South is a surrounded by the Gothamipura, Narahenpita, Kurunduwatta and Borella North Grama Niladhari Divisions.

Demographics

Ethnicity 

The Borella South Grama Niladhari Division has a Sinhalese majority (67.5%), a significant Moor population (14.7%) and a significant Sri Lankan Tamil population (14.4%). In comparison, the Thimbirigasyaya Divisional Secretariat (which contains the Borella South Grama Niladhari Division) has a Sinhalese majority (52.8%), a significant Sri Lankan Tamil population (28.0%) and a significant Moor population (15.1%)

Religion 

The Borella South Grama Niladhari Division has a Buddhist majority (57.4%), a significant Muslim population (16.7%) and a significant Hindu population (11.9%). In comparison, the Thimbirigasyaya Divisional Secretariat (which contains the Borella South Grama Niladhari Division) has a Buddhist plurality (47.9%), a significant Hindu population (22.5%) and a significant Muslim population (17.4%)

Gallery

References 

Grama Niladhari Divisions of Thimbirigasyaya Divisional Secretariat